The 2011–12 Philadelphia 76ers season was the 73rd season of the franchise, 63rd in the National Basketball Association (NBA), and the 49th in Philadelphia. The Sixers finished the regular season with a 35–31 record, earning the eighth seed in the Eastern Conference and a berth in the 2012 NBA Playoffs. Philadelphia faced the top-seeded Chicago Bulls in the first round and won the series in six games. This marked the first time the Sixers won an NBA playoffs series since 2003, when they defeated the New Orleans Hornets in six games in the First Round. This was only the fifth time an eighth-seeded team beat a first-seeded team in the playoffs in league history, following the Denver Nuggets in 1994, the New York Knicks in 1999, the Golden State Warriors in 2007, and the Memphis Grizzlies in 2011. The Sixers ended their postseason run after losing in seven games to the Boston Celtics in the Eastern Conference semi-finals.

This marked the last time the Sixers made the playoffs until 2018.

Key dates
 June 23: The 2011 NBA draft took place at Prudential Center in Newark, New Jersey.
 December 26: The 76ers begin their regular season with a loss against the Portland Trail Blazers
 April 23: Philadelphia secured a playoff spot in a 105–87 win against the New Jersey Nets.

NBA draft

Roster

Pre-season

Game log

|- bgcolor="#ccffcc"
| 1
| December 16
| @ Washington
| 
| Louis Williams (19)
| Spencer Hawes (9)
| Andre Iguodala,Jrue Holiday,Nikola Vucevic
| Verizon Center
| 1–0
|- bgcolor="Ccffcc"
| 2
| December 20
| Washington
| 
| Jrue Holiday (24)
| Spencer Hawes (13)
| Jrue Holiday (6)
| Wells Fargo Center
| 2–0

Regular season

Standings

Record vs. opponents

Game log

|- bgcolor=#ffcccc
| 1
| December 26
| @ Portland
| 
| Louis Williams (25)
| Spencer Hawes (14)
| Spencer Hawes (9)
| Rose Garden20,509
| 0–1
|- bgcolor=#ccffcc
| 2
| December 28
| @ Phoenix
| 
| Three players (15)
| Spencer Hawes (11)
| Andre Iguodala (6)
| US Airways Center16,360
| 1–1
|- bgcolor=#ffcccc
| 3
| December 30
| @ Utah
| 
| Jrue Holiday (22)
| Spencer Hawes (13)
| Louis Williams (5)
| EnergySolutions Arena19,911
| 1–2
|- bgcolor=#ccffcc
| 4
| December 31
| @ Golden State
| 
| Louis Williams (23)
| Spencer Hawes (12)
| Andre Iguodala (7)
| Oracle Arena19,084
| 2–2

|- bgcolor=#ccffcc
| 5
| January 4
| @ New Orleans
| 
| Jrue Holiday (23)
| Elton Brand (12)
| Jrue Holiday (8)
| New Orleans Arena12,387
| 3–2
|- bgcolor=#ccffcc
| 6
| January 6
| Detroit
| 
| Jodie Meeks (21)
| Spencer Hawes (14)
| Jrue Holiday (9)
| Wells Fargo Center19,408
| 4–2
|- bgcolor=#ccffcc
| 7
| January 7
| Toronto
| 
| Jrue HolidayAndre Iguodala (14)
| Andre IguodalaNikola Vučević (10)
| Jrue Holiday (6)
| Wells Fargo Center14,522
| 5–2
|- bgcolor=#ccffcc
| 8
| January 9
| Indiana
| 
| Andre Iguodala (20)
| Andre Iguodala (9)
| Louis Williams (6)
| Wells Fargo Center8,612
| 6–2
|- bgcolor=#ccffcc
| 9
| January 10
| Sacramento
| 
| Elton Brand (21)
| Elton BrandEvan Turner (10)
| Jrue HolidayEvan Turner (8)
| Wells Fargo Center10,255
| 7–2
|- bgcolor=#ffcccc
| 10
| January 11
| @ New York
| 
| Andre IguodalaEvan Turner (16)
| Elton Brand (10)
| Jrue Holiday (4)
| Madison Square Garden19,763
| 7–3
|- bgcolor=#ccffcc
| 11
| January 13
| Washington
| 
| Jodie Meeks (26)
| Spencer Hawes (10)
| Louis Williams (6)
| Wells Fargo Center14,213
| 8–3
|- bgcolor=#ccffcc
| 12
| January 14
| @ Washington
| 
| Louis Williams (24)
| Andre Iguodala (7)
| Andre Iguodala (5)
| Verizon Center13,998
| 9–3
|- bgcolor=#ccffcc
| 13
| January 16
| Milwaukee
| 
| Jrue Holiday (24)
| Spencer Hawes (10)
| Louis Williams (6)
| Wells Fargo Center17,281
| 10–3
|- bgcolor=#ffcccc
| 14
| January 18
| Denver
| 
| Thaddeus Young (22)
| Evan Turner (11)
| Andre Iguodala (9)
| Wells Fargo Center15,201
| 10–4
|- bgcolor=#ccffcc
| 15
| January 20
| Atlanta
| 
| Thaddeus Young (20)
| Elton Brand (16)
| Jrue Holiday (11)
| Wells Fargo Center17,724
| 11–4
|- bgcolor=#ffcccc
| 16
| January 21
| @ Miami
| 
| Louis Williams (22)
| Nikola Vucevic (9)
| Jrue Holiday, Louis Williams, Evan Turner (4)
| American Airlines Arena19,725
| 11–5
|- bgcolor=#ccffcc
| 17
| January 23
| Washington
| 
| Jrue Holiday, Elton Brand (17)
| Elton Brand (9)
| Andre Iguodala (11)
| Wells Fargo Center10,108
| 12–5
|- bgcolor=#ffcccc
| 18
| January 25
| New Jersey
| 
| Louis Williams (17)
| Jodie Meeks (8)
| Jrue Holiday (7)
| Wells Fargo Center13,138
| 12–6
|- bgcolor=#ccffcc
| 19
| January 27
| Charlotte
| 
| Louis Williams (17)
| Evan Turner, Lavoy Allen (7)
| Andre Iguodala (6)
| Wells Fargo Center16,199
| 13–6
|- bgcolor=#ccffcc
| 20
| January 28
| Detroit
| 
| Louis Williams (17)
| Andre Iguodala (10)
| Andre Iguodala (10)
| Wells Fargo Center18,710
| 14–6
|- bgcolor=#ccffcc
| 21
| January 30
| Orlando
| 
| Andre Iguodala (14)
| Andre Iguodala (11)
| Andre Iguodala, Jrue Holiday (6)
| Wells Fargo Center16,299
| 15–6

|- bgcolor=#ccffcc
| 22
| February 1
| Chicago
| 
| Andre Iguodala, Thaddeus Young (19)
| Andre Iguodala (9)
| Louis Williams (6)
| Wells Fargo Center18,325
| 16–6
|- bgcolor=#ffcccc
| 23
| February 3
| Miami
| 
| Thaddeus Young (16)
| Andre Iguodala, Tony Battie (7)
| Jrue Holiday (7)
| Wells Fargo Center20,694
| 16–7
|- bgcolor=#ccffcc
| 24
| February 4
| @ Atlanta
| 
| Nikola Vucevic (15)
| Andre Iguodala (8)
| Andre Iguodala (10)
| Philips Arena18,012
| 17–7
|- bgcolor=#ccffcc
| 25
| February 6
| L. A. Lakers
| 
| Louis Williams (24)
| Nikola Vucevic (6)
| Jrue Holiday (6)
| Wells Fargo Center20,064
| 18–7
|- bgcolor=#ffcccc
| 26
| February 8
| San Antonio
| 
| Louis Williams (22)
| Elton Brand (13)
| Jrue Holiday (7)
| Wells Fargo Center18,070
| 18–8
|- bgcolor=#ffcccc
| 27
| February 10
| L. A. Clippers
| 
| Elton BrandAndre Iguodala (12)
| Elton Brand (10)
| Jrue Holiday (8)
| Wells Fargo Center20,539
| 18–9
|- bgcolor=#ccffcc
| 28
| February 11
| @ Cleveland
| 
| Jrue Holiday (20)
| Andre IguodalaThaddeus Young (6)
| Three players (5)
| Quicken Loans Arena17,155
| 19–9
|- bgcolor=#ccffcc
| 29
| February 13
| @ Charlotte
| 
| Lou Williams (23)
| Nikola Vucevic (10)
| Andre Iguodala (9)
| Time Warner Cable Arena13,773
| 20–9
|- bgcolor=#ffcccc
| 30
| February 15
| @ Orlando
| 
| Louis Williams (21)
| Evan Turner (8)
| Louis Williams (7)
| Amway Center18,846
| 20–10
|- bgcolor=#ffcccc
| 31
| February 17
| Dallas
| 
| Nikola Vucevic (26)
| Lavoy Allen (10)
| Andre Iguodala (7)
| Wells Fargo Center19,369
| 20–11
|- bgcolor=#ffcccc
| 32
| February 19
| @ Minnesota
| 
| Jrue Holiday (20)
| Lavoy Allen (8)
| Andre IguodalaEvan Turner (3)
| Target Center18,759
| 20–12
|- bgcolor=#ffcccc
| 33
| February 21
| @ Memphis
| 
| Jrue Holiday (22)
| Thaddeus Young (7)
| Andre Iguodala (7)
| FedExForum14,258
| 20–13
|- bgcolor=#ffcccc
| 34
| February 22
| @ Houston
| 
| Nikola Vucevic (18)
| Nikola Vucevic (8)
| Andre Iguodala (4)
| Toyota Center12,820
| 20–14
|- align="center"
|colspan="9" bgcolor="#bbcaff"|All-Star Break
|- bgcolor=#ccffcc
| 35
| February 28
| @ Detroit
| 
| Thaddeus Young (20)
| Thaddeus Young (8)
| Lou Williams (7)
| The Palace of Auburn Hills11,916
| 21–14
|- bgcolor=#ffcccc
| 36
| February 29
| Oklahoma City
| 
| Jrue HolidayAndre Iguodala (18)
| Elton Brand (10)
| Andre IguodalaLouis Williams (6)
| Wells Fargo Center19,746
| 21–15

|- bgcolor=#ccffcc
| 37
| March 2
| Golden State
| 
| Lou Williams (25)
| Elton Brand (14)
| Andre Iguodala (6)
| Wells Fargo Center18,323
| 22–15
|- bgcolor=#ffcccc
| 38
| March 4
| Chicago
| 
| Thaddeus Young (17)
| Elton Brand (13)
| Louis Williams (7)
| Wells Fargo Center19,683
| 22–16
|- bgcolor=#ffcccc
| 39
| March 5
| @ Milwaukee
| 
| Lou Williams (26)
| Thaddeus Young (13)
| Jrue Holiday, Andre Iguodala (5)
| Bradley Center12,315
| 22–17
|- bgcolor=#ccffcc
| 40
| March 7
| Boston
| 
| Evan Turner (26)
| Nikola Vucevic (12)
| Andre Iguodala (8)
| Wells Fargo Center 18,508
| 23–17
|- bgcolor=#ccffcc
| 41
| March 9
| Utah
| 
| Lou WilliamsThaddeus Young (21)
| Evan Turner (12)
| Andre Iguodala (10)
| Wells Fargo Center18,512
| 24–17
|- bgcolor=#ccffcc
| 42
| March 11
| @ New York
| 
| Lou Williams (28)
| Evan Turner (15)
| Andre Iguodala (8)
| Madison Square Garden19,763
| 25–17
|- bgcolor=#ffcccc
| 43
| March 14
| @ Indiana
| 
| Evan Turner (21)
| Elton BrandEvan Turner (5)
| Andre Iguodala (9)
| Bankers Life Fieldhouse13,081
| 25–18
|- bgcolor=#ffcccc
| 44
| March 16
| Miami
| 
| Evan Turner (13)
| Andre Iguodala (10)
| Evan Turner (5)
| Wells Fargo Center20,396
| 25–19
|- bgcolor=#ffcccc
| 45
| March 17
| @ Chicago
| 
| Jrue Holiday (30)
| Spencer HawesThaddeus Young (7)
| Jrue Holiday (5)
| United Center22,225
| 25–20
|- bgcolor=#ccffcc
| 46
| March 19
| @ Charlotte
| 
| Jrue HolidayThaddeus Young (20)
| Spencer Hawes (11)
| Jrue Holiday (6)
| Time Warner Cable Arena12,792
| 26–20
|- bgcolor=#ffcccc
| 47
| March 21
| New York
| 
| Jrue Holiday (16)
| Elton Brand (12)
| Jrue HolidayAndre Iguodala (6)
| Wells Fargo Center20,470
| 26–21
|- bgcolor=#ccffcc
| 48
| March 23
| Boston
| 
| Elton Brand (20)
| Spencer Hawes (10)
| Andre Iguodala (8)
| Wells Fargo Center19,583
| 27–21
|- bgcolor=#ffcccc
| 49
| March 25
| @ San Antonio
| 
| Elton Brand (14)
| Elton BrandSam Young (9)
| Spencer Hawes (4)
| AT&T Center18,581
| 27–22
|- bgcolor=#ccffcc
| 50
| March 27
| Cleveland
| 
| Jodie Meeks (31)
| Spencer Hawes (8)
| Louis Williams (9)
| Wells Fargo Center17,832
| 28–22
|- bgcolor=#ffcccc
| 51
| March 30
| @ Washington
| 
| Louis WilliamsThaddeus Young (14)
| Elton Brand (9)
| Jrue Holiday (4)
| Verizon Center18,066
| 28–23
|- bgcolor=#ccffcc
| 52
| March 31
| Atlanta
| 
| Elton Brand (25)
| Elton Brand (10)
| Jrue Holiday (6)
| Wells Fargo Center19,714
| 29–23

|- bgcolor=#ffcccc
| 53
| April 3
| @ Miami
| 
| Evan Turner (26)
| Evan Turner (8)
| Jrue Holiday (6)
| American Airlines Arena20,015
| 29–24
|- bgcolor=#ffcccc
| 54
| April 4
| Toronto
| 
| Elton BrandJrue Holiday (20)
| Spencer Hawes (9)
| Andre Iguodala (6)
| Wells Fargo Center18,186
| 29–25
|- bgcolor=#ffcccc
| 55
| April 7
| Orlando
| 
| Thaddeus Young (20)
| Elton Brand (11)
| Andre Iguodala (10)
| Wells Fargo Center19,775
| 29–26
|- bgcolor=#ffcccc
| 56
| April 8
| @ Boston
| 
| Nikola Vucevic (14)
| Nikola Vucevic (13)
| Louis Williams (5)
| TD Garden18,624
| 29–27
|- bgcolor=#ccffcc
| 57
| April 10
| @ New Jersey
| 
| Louis Williams (20)
| Four players (8)
| Andre Iguodala (7)
| Prudential Center15,376
| 30–27
|- bgcolor=#ccffcc
| 58
| April 11
| @ Toronto
| 
| Thaddeus Young (17)
| Elton BrandEvan Turner (8)
| Jrue Holiday (7)
| Air Canada Centre16,324
| 31–27
|- bgcolor=#ffcccc
| 59
| April 13
| New Jersey
| 
| Jrue Holiday (19)
| Spencer Hawes (10)
| Jrue Holiday (6)
| Wells Fargo Center19,169
| 31–28
|- bgcolor=#ffcccc
| 60
| April 16
| @ Orlando
| 
| Jrue Holiday (18)
| Andre Iguodala (8)
| Spencer Hawes (9)
| Amway Center18,846
| 31–29
|- bgcolor=#ffcccc
| 61
| April 17
| Indiana
| 
| Andre Iguodala (23)
| Elton BrandSpencer Hawes (8)
| Andre Iguodala (6)
| Wells Fargo Center18,969
| 31–30
|- bgcolor=#ccffcc
| 62
| April 18
| @ Cleveland
| 
| Jrue Holiday (24)
| Andre Iguodala (13)
| Andre Iguodala (7)
| Quicken Loans Arena14,678
| 32–30
|- bgcolor=#ccffcc
| 63
| April 21
| @ Indiana
| 
| Elton Brand (20)
| Elton Brand (9)
| Jrue Holiday (7)
| Bankers Life Fieldhouse17,701
| 33–30
|- bgcolor=#ccffcc
| 64
| April 23
| @ New Jersey
| 
| Three players (15)
| Andre Iguodala (7)
| Andre Iguodala (9)
| Prudential Center18,711
| 34–30
|- bgcolor=#ccffcc
| 65
| April 25
| @ Milwaukee
| 
| Evan Turner (29)
| Evan Turner (13)
| Evan Turner (6)
| Bradley Center13,489
| 35–30
|- bgcolor=#ffcccc
| 66
| April 26
| @ Detroit
| 
| Spencer Hawes (16)
| Nikola Vucevic (12)
| Evan Turner (6)
| The Palace of Auburn Hills15,372
| 35–31

Playoffs

|- bgcolor=ffcccc
| 1
| April 28
| @ Chicago
| 
| Elton Brand (19)
| Elton Brand, Jrue Holiday (7)
| Andre Iguodala, Evan Turner (5)
| United Center21,943
| 0–1

|- bgcolor=ccffcc
| 2
| May 1
| @ Chicago
| 
| Jrue Holiday (26)
| Lavoy Allen (9)
| Three players (6)
| United Center22,067
| 1–1

|- bgcolor=ccffcc
| 3
| May 4
| Chicago
| 
| Spencer Hawes (21)
| Thaddeus Young (11)
| Jrue Holiday (6)
| Wells Fargo Center20,381
| 2–1

|- bgcolor=ccffcc
| 4
| May 6
| Chicago
| 
| Spencer Hawes (22)
| Andre Iguodala (12)
| Jrue Holiday (6)
| Wells Fargo Center20,381
| 3–1

|- bgcolor=ffcccc
| 5
| May 8
| @ Chicago
| 
| Spencer Hawes (16)
| Andre Iguodala (14)
| Jrue Holiday (4)
| United Center22,093
| 3–2

|- bgcolor=ccffcc
| 6
| May 10
| Chicago
| 
| Andre Iguodala (20)
| Spencer Hawes (10)
| Andre Iguodala (7)
| Wells Fargo Center20,362
| 4–2

|- bgcolor=ffcccc
| 1
| May 12
| @ Boston
| 
| Andre Iguodala (19)
| Evan Turner (10)
| Andre Iguodala (6)
| TD Garden18,624
| 0–1

|- bgcolor=ccffcc
| 2
| May 14
| @ Boston
| 
| Jrue Holiday (18)
| Spencer Hawes (10)
| Andre Iguodala (7)
| TD Garden18,624
| 1–1

|- bgcolor=ffcccc
| 3
| May 16
| Boston
| 
| Thaddeus Young (22)
| Evan Turner (8)
| Jrue Holiday (9)
| Wells Fargo Center20,351
| 1–2

|- bgcolor=ccffcc
| 4
| May 18
| Boston
| 
| Andre Iguodala, Evan Turner (16)
| Lavoy Allen (10)
| Louis Williams (8)
| Wells Fargo Center20,411
| 2–2

|- bgcolor=ffcccc
| 5
| May 21
| @ Boston
| 
| Elton Brand (19)
| Evan Turner (10)
| Jrue Holiday (7)
| TD Garden18,624
| 2–3

|- bgcolor=ccffcc
| 6
| May 23
| Boston
| 
| Jrue Holiday (20)
| Elton Brand (10)
| Jrue Holiday, Louis Williams (6)
| Wells Fargo Center20,403
| 3–3

|- bgcolor=ffcccc
| 7
| May 26
| @ Boston
| 
| Andre Iguodala (18)
| Thaddeus Young (10)
| Jrue Holiday (9)
| TD Garden18,624
| 3–4

Player statistics

Season

|-style="text-align:center"
| 
| 41 || 15 || 15.2 || .473 ||  || .786 || 4.2 || .8 || .3 || .4 || 4.1
|-style="text-align:center"
| 
| 27 || 11 || 10.9 || .373 || .000 ||style="background:#1560BD;color:white;"|1.000 || 2.5 || .6 || .1 || .2 || 1.6
|-style="text-align:center"
| 
| 14 || 1 || 6.3 || .273 || .333 || .500 || 1.1 || .6 || .0 || .1 || 1.6
|-style="text-align:center"
| 
| 60 || 60 || 28.9 || .494 || .000 || .733 || 7.2 || 1.6 || 1.0 ||style="background:#1560BD;color:white;"|1.6 || 11.0
|-style="text-align:center"
| 
| 5 || 0 || 3.2 || .333 ||  ||  || .2 || .2 || .2 || .2 || .4
|-style="text-align:center"
| 
| 37 || 29 || 24.9 || .489 || .250 || .727 ||style="background:#1560BD;color:white;"|7.3 || 2.6 || .4 || 1.3 || 9.6
|-style="text-align:center"
| 
| 65 ||style="background:#1560BD;color:white;"|65 || 33.8 || .432 || .380 || .783 || 3.3 || 4.5 || 1.6 || .3 || 13.5
|-style="text-align:center"
| 
| 62 || 62 ||style="background:#1560BD;color:white;"|35.6 || .454 || .394 || .617 || 6.1 ||style="background:#1560BD;color:white;"|5.5 ||style="background:#1560BD;color:white;"|1.7 || .5 || 12.4
|-style="text-align:center"
| 
|style="background:#1560BD;color:white;"|66 || 50 || 24.9 || .409 || .365 || .906 || 2.4 || .8 || .6 || .0 || 8.4
|-style="text-align:center"
| 
| 11 || 1 || 5.1 || .250 || .167 || .545 || 1.3 || .1 || .1 || .1 || 1.5
|-style="text-align:center"
| 
| 2 || 0 || 19.5 || .267 || .167 || .667 || 2.0 || 1.5 || .0 || .0 || 5.5
|-style="text-align:center"
| 
| 65 || 20 || 26.4 || .446 || .224 || .676 || 5.8 || 2.8 || .6 || .3 || 9.4
|-style="text-align:center"
| 
| 51 || 15 || 15.9 || .450 || .375 || .529 || 4.8 || .6 || .4 || .7 || 5.5
|-style="text-align:center"
| 
| 64 || 0 || 26.3 || .407 || .362 || .812 || 2.4 || 3.5 || .8 || .3 ||style="background:#1560BD;color:white;"|14.9
|-style="text-align:center"
| 
| 14 || 0 || 9.6 || .295 ||style="background:#1560BD;color:white;"|.625 || .643 || 1.5 || .4 || .4 || .3 || 2.9
|-style="text-align:center"
| 
| 63 || 1 || 27.9 ||style="background:#1560BD;color:white;"|.507 || .250 || .771 || 5.2 || 1.2 || 1.0 || .7 || 12.8
|}
  Statistics with the Philadelphia 76ers.

Playoffs

|-style="text-align:center"
| 
| 12 || 1 || 19.7 || .557 ||  || .583 || 4.9 || .3 || .8 || .9 || 6.3
|-style="text-align:center"
| 
| 13 || 13 || 27.4 || .465 ||  || .625 || 4.8 || .5 || .8 ||style="background:#1560BD;color:white;"|1.5 || 8.6
|-style="text-align:center"
| 
| 13 || 12 || 25.5 || .463 || .400 || .731 || 6.6 || 1.6 || .3 || .9 || 9.3
|-style="text-align:center"
| 
| 13 || 13 || 38.0 || .413 ||style="background:#1560BD;color:white;"|.408 || .864 || 4.7 ||style="background:#1560BD;color:white;"|5.2 ||style="background:#1560BD;color:white;"|1.6 || .6 ||style="background:#1560BD;color:white;"|15.8
|-style="text-align:center"
| 
| 13 || 13 ||style="background:#1560BD;color:white;"|38.8 || .384 || .388 || .589 || 5.7 || 3.7 || 1.5 || .4 || 12.9
|-style="text-align:center"
| 
| 13 || 1 || 7.8 || .346 || .231 ||style="background:#1560BD;color:white;"|1.000 || .3 || .3 || .2 || .1 || 2.7
|-style="text-align:center"
| 
| 2 || 0 || 2.0 ||style="background:#1560BD;color:white;"|1.000 ||  ||  || 1.0 || .0 || .0 || .0 || 1.0
|-style="text-align:center"
| 
| 13 || 12 || 34.5 || .364 || .000 || .688 ||style="background:#1560BD;color:white;"|'''7.5 || 2.5 || .9 || .5 || 11.2
|-style="text-align:center"
| 
| 1 || 0 || 3.0 || .000 ||  || .500 || 1.0 || .0 || .0 || .0 || 1.0
|-style="text-align:center"
| 
| 13 || 0 || 27.5 || .352 || .167 || .788 || 2.1 || 3.0 || 1.0 || .0 || 11.5
|-style="text-align:center"
| 
| 2 || 0 || 2.0 || .000 || .000 ||  || .0 || .0 || .0 || .0 || .0
|-style="text-align:center"
| 
| 13 || 0 || 21.3 || .429 ||  || .710 || 5.2 || 1.2 || .5 || .5 || 7.7
|}

Awards and milestones
 Andre Iguodala was selected for the 2012 NBA All-Star Game. It was his first appearance.

Disciplinary actions
 Head coach Doug Collins was fined US$15,000 for verbally abusing an official during a game against the Indiana Pacers.

Transactions

Overview

Trades

Free agents

Many players signed with teams from other leagues due to the 2011 NBA lockout. FIBA allows players under NBA contracts to sign and play for teams from other leagues if the contracts have opt-out clauses that allow the players to return to the NBA if the lockout ends. The Chinese Basketball Association, however, only allows its clubs to sign foreign free agents who could play for at least the entire season.

See also
2011–12 NBA season

References

Philadelphia 76ers seasons
Philadelphia 76ers
Philadelphia
Philadelphia